John MacGregor VC MC & Bar DCM ED (1 February 1889 – 9 June 1952) was a Scottish-Canadian soldier. MacGregor was a recipient of the Victoria Cross, the highest and most prestigious award for gallantry in the face of the enemy that can be awarded to British and Commonwealth forces. MacGregor served in the Canadian army in both world wars.

Details
Macgregor was born in Cawdor near Nairn, Scotland in 1889 and moved to Canada in 1909. He served in the army from 1915 to 1919. MacGregor was 29 years old, and a temporary captain in the 2nd Regiment, Canadian Mounted Rifles, Canadian Expeditionary Force during the First World War when the following deed during the Battle of the Canal du Nord took place for which he was awarded the Victoria Cross.

During the period 29 September/3 October 1918 near Cambrai, France, Captain MacGregor acted with most conspicuous bravery and leadership. He led his company under intense fire, and although wounded, located and put out of action enemy machine-guns which were checking progress, killing four and taking eight prisoners. He then reorganised his command under heavy fire and in the face of stubborn resistance continued the advance. Later, after a personal daylight reconnaissance under heavy fire, he established his company in Neuville St. Remy, thereby greatly assisting the advance into Tilloy.

Freemasonry
He was initiated into Freemasonry in Tyee Lodge, No.66, (Prince Rupert, British Columbia) on 20 March 1920, Passed on 29 September 1920 and Raised on 8 March 1921. After serving during WWII he joined Westview Lodge, No.133, (Powell River, British Columbia) on 2 May 1950.

Further information
MacGregor served again from 1940 to 1946, achieving the rank of lieutenant colonel commanding the 2nd The Canadian Scottish Regiment (Princess Mary's). He is buried at Cranberry Lake Cemetery, Powell River, British Columbia.

His biography was published under the title MacGregor V.C..

MacGregor's Victoria Cross and other medals are on display at the Canadian War Museum in Ottawa, Ontario.

References

Further reading 
Monuments to Courage (David Harvey, 1999)
The Register of the Victoria Cross (This England, 1997)
Scotland's Forgotten Valour (Graham Ross, 1995)
VCs of the First World War - The Final Days 1918 (Gerald Gliddon, 2000)

External links
 John MacGregor's digitized service file
 MacGregor, VC
 Legion Magazine Article on John MacGregor
 John MacGregor biography on DND's Directorate of History and Heritage

Canadian World War I recipients of the Victoria Cross
1889 births
1952 deaths
British emigrants to Canada
Canadian Expeditionary Force officers
Canadian recipients of the Distinguished Conduct Medal
People from Nairn
Canadian military personnel of World War I
Canadian recipients of the Military Cross
Canadian Army personnel of World War II
Canadian Scottish Regiment (Princess Mary's) officers